The Festihorn is a mountain of the Swiss Pennine Alps, located west of St. Niklaus in the canton of Valais. It lies on the range south of the Jungtal, between the Sparruhorn and the Wasuhorn.

References

External links
 Festihorn on Hikr
 https://www.google.com/maps/place/Festihorn/data=!4m2!3m1!1s0x478f3ed36146edbd:0x29afbbe78c992ba1!5m1!1e4?sa=X&ved=0ahUKEwiUr-LUkojNAhWBpx4KHZ8sCoQQ8gEIGzAA

Mountains of the Alps
Alpine three-thousanders
Mountains of Switzerland
Mountains of Valais